Brdice pri Kožbani is a small settlement northeast of Kožbana in the Municipality of Brda in the Littoral region of Slovenia.

References

External links
Brdice pri Kožbani on Geopedia

Populated places in the Municipality of Brda